Samuel Brolin (born 29 September 2000) is a Swedish football goalkeeper who plays for AC Horsens, on loan from AIK.

References

2000 births
Living people
Swedish footballers
Swedish expatriate footballers
Association football goalkeepers
People from Lidköping Municipality
Sportspeople from Västra Götaland County
Vasalunds IF players
Akropolis IF players
Mjällby AIF players
Ettan Fotboll players
Superettan players
Allsvenskan players
Swedish expatriate sportspeople in Denmark
Expatriate men's footballers in Denmark